Anop Ravi Santosh Kumar (Urdu : انوپ روی سنتوش کمار ) (born 23 June 1991) is a Pakistani cricketer. He was a member of the Pakistan U-19 national cricket team. He is a wicketkeeping batsman and plays for Pakistan International Airlines in the domestic tournaments.

Under-19s Career

Santosh was part of the runner up team at the 8th ICC Under-19 Cricket World Cup held in New Zealand in 2010.

References

External links
Anop Ravi

Pakistani Hindus
Pakistan International Airlines cricketers
Living people
Cricketers from Karachi
Pakistani cricketers
1991 births